Andrena minutula  is a Palearctic species of mining bee.

References

External links
Images representing Andrena minutula  

Hymenoptera of Europe
minutula
Insects described in 1802